Josep Reynés i Gurguí (1850, Barcelona, Spain - 4 June 1926, Barcelona, Spain) was a Spanish sculptor. He devoted himself primarily to interior decoration, but also created religious and funerary works.

Life and work 

His first studies were at the Escola de la Llotja, with the brothers  and Agapit Vallmitjana. He completed them in Paris, from 1873 to 1876, where he worked in the studios of Jean-Baptiste Carpeaux. His first major work came in 1888, when he was part of a group of sculptors who decorated the "Arc de Triomf", the monumental entrance to the Exposición Universal de Barcelona. He was in charge of creating the relief on the main frieze: "Barcelona Welcomes the Nations".

In 1890, he was awarded a first-class medal at the National Exhibition of Fine Arts in Madrid; for his work, La Violinista. In 1898, he produced a monument to El Greco, in Sitges, designed in the Catalan Modernist style.

He created numerous works for the Montjuïc Cemetery; including an allegorical figure of religion at the Salvador Bonaplata Pantheon (1886), figures representing Faith and Hope at the Carles Godó Pantheon (1899), and female sculptures in the neo-gothic chapel at the Gener-Seycher Pantheon (1902-1906). 

In 1915, he  created several ornamental busts for the façade of the Palau del Parlament de Catalunya; notably of the artists  and Antoni Viladomat.

Some of his works may be seen at the Museu Nacional d'Art de Catalunya. His brother, Antoni (1853-1910), was a landscape and flower painter.

References

Further reading 
 Ignasi de Lecea, Jaume Fabre and Carme Grandas: Art públic de Barcelona, Ayuntamiento de Barcelona and Àmbit Serveis Editorials, 2009,

External links

1850 births
1926 deaths
Spanish sculptors
Sculptors from Catalonia
Artists from Barcelona